Norse Merchant Ferries was an Irish Sea ferry company that operating passenger and freight RORO services between England the Republic of Ireland and Northern Ireland.

History
Norse Merchant Ferries was created in October 1999 when Cenargo, the owners of Merchant Ferries purchased Norse Irish Ferries.  The companies operated separately until February 2001 when Norse Merchant Ferries was officially launched.

In January 2003 Cenargo filed voluntary petitions for relief under Chapter 11 of the United States Bankruptcy Code.  The shipping subsidiaries of Cenargo emerged from administration in December 2003 as Norse Merchant Group.

In November 2005 the Norse Merchant Group was acquired by Maersk and integrated into Norfolkline

Routes

Norse Merchant Ferries operated the following routes across the Irish Sea

 Liverpool (Canada Dock) - Dublin
 Liverpool (Brocklebank Dock) - Belfast
 Heysham - Dublin (Freight only)
 Heysham - Belfast (Freight only)

Note: The Liverpool services where transferred to Birkenhead Twelve Quays in 2002

Fleet
 Merchant Venture
 Lindarosa
 Norse Mersey
 Dawn Merchant
 Brave Merchant
 Merchant Bravery
 Merchant Brilliant
 RR Arrow
 RR Shield
 Saga Moon
 River Lune
 Liverpool Viking
 Dublin Viking
 Lagan Viking
 Mersey Viking

References

External links
 Norfolkline

Defunct shipping companies of the United Kingdom